The Hers-Mort (the "Dead Hers", as opposed to the faster-flowing Hers-Vif, or "Live Hers") is a  long river in southern France, a right-bank tributary of the Garonne. The Hers-Mort rises in the Lauragais region, near the village Fonters-du-Razès, in the Aude department. It flows northwest through the following departments and towns:

Aude: Payra-sur-l'Hers, Salles-sur-l'Hers
Haute-Garonne: Villefranche-de-Lauragais, Baziège, Toulouse, Saint-Jory

It flows into the Garonne near Grenade-sur-Garonne. Its waters, augmented by the Girou which flows into its right bank, irrigate the market gardens around Toulouse. The Canal du Midi crosses the Hers-Mort near Villefranche-de-Lauragais via the Hers Aqueduct.

Notelist

References

Rivers of France
Rivers of Aude
Rivers of Haute-Garonne
Rivers of Occitania (administrative region)